Peter Alan Simpson (born 1942) is an academic, writer, literary critic, and former New Zealand politician of the Labour Party.

Early life
Simpson was born in Tākaka in 1942. From 1955 to 1959, he was educated at Nelson College, where he was a prefect and member of the school's 1st XV rugby union team in his final year. He gained a MA (Hons) from the University of Canterbury, and a PhD from the University of Toronto with a 1975 thesis titled  'Wordsworth to Hardy: lines of relationship and continuity in nineteenth century English poetry' .

Member of Parliament

He represented the electorate of Lyttelton in Parliament from 1987 to 1990, when he was defeated by Gail McIntosh, one of a number of losses contributing to the fall of the Fourth Labour Government.

Before entering parliament he was chairman of the Lyttelton electorate committee of the Labour Party.

Professional life
Simpson had been teaching English since the 1960s at various universities. He was at Massey University, University of Toronto and Carleton University. In his last teaching role, he was at the University of Auckland as associate professor in the Department of English, and head of English, roles from which he retired in 2008.

He is the director of Holloway Press, set up at the University of Auckland in 1994 and named after Ron Holloway (1909–2003), a renowned university printer and publisher.

In 2020, Simpson was conferred an honorary Doctor of Letters degree by the University of Canterbury.

Selected works 

 Ronald Hugh Morrieson (Oxford University Press, 1982)
 Candles in a Dark Room: James K. Baxter and Colin McCahon (Auckland Art Gallery, 1996)
 Colin McCahon: The Titirangi Years, 1953–1959 (Auckland University Press, 2007)
 Fantastica: The World of Leo Bensemann (Auckland University Press, 2011)
 Bloomsbury South: The Arts in Christchurch 1933–1953 (Auckland University Press, 2016)
 Colin McCahon: Is this the Promised Land? Vol. 2 1960-1987 (Auckland University Press, 2020)

Private life
Simpson lives in Auckland. He is married with two children.

References

Living people
New Zealand Labour Party MPs
1942 births
People educated at Nelson College
Academic staff of the University of Auckland
University of Canterbury alumni
University of Toronto alumni
New Zealand MPs for Christchurch electorates
Members of the New Zealand House of Representatives
Unsuccessful candidates in the 1990 New Zealand general election